Barner is an originally German family of ancient nobility originating in Mecklenburg. A branch established in Denmark at the entrance to the 18th century.

Possessions

Germany
 Bülow seit 1590
 Badegow seit 1678/82
 Ganzkow
 Klein Görnow seit vor 1628
 Kressin pfandweise 1784-1788
 Kucksdorf, teilweise pfandweise 1696-ca. 1770
 Moltow seit 1754
 Sülten vor 1512-1760
 Trams seit 1754
 Groß und Klein Trebbow seit 1754
 Rützenfelde (Pommern) um die Mitte des 18. Jahrhunderts

References

Denmark
 Vedbygård

External links
 Family tree

Mecklenburgian nobility
Danish noble families